Aztecaster is a genus of Mexican flowering plants in the family Asteraceae.

 Species
 Aztecaster matudae (Rzed.) G.L.Nesom - Nuevo León, Coahuila, Zacatecas, San Luis Potosí
 Aztecaster pyramidatus (B.L.Rob. & Greenm.) G.L.Nesom - Oaxaca

References

Endemic flora of Mexico
Asteraceae genera
Astereae